The Bankstown Poetry Slam is the largest regular poetry slam in Australia.

History

It was founded in 2013 by Sara Mansour and Ahmad Al Rady, and held in the south west Sydney suburb of Bankstown. Since its inception, it has featured notable poets such as Omar Musa, Luka Lesson, Rupi Kaur and Rudy Francisco. It has held grand slams at the Art Gallery of New South Wales, Sydney Town Hall, and The Sydney ICC.

In 2018, security guards were hired for the event after comments from Australian politician Mark Latham incited online threats and abuse against attendees.

References

External links

2013 establishments in Australia
Recurring events established in 2013
Bankstown, New South Wales
Poetry slams
Annual events in Australia